The Socialist Workers Party of Hungary was a political party in Hungary. The party was founded by social democrats and communists in 1925, and led by István Vági. Unlike the established Hungarian Social Democratic Party, the Socialist Workers Party sought to mobilize mass movements and agrarian struggles.

Imre Nagy, the future prime minister and leader of the 1956 Revolution, was involved in organizing the underground MSZMP chapter in his home town of Kaposvár. The Hungarian Socialist Workers' Party he helped establish during the Revolution was similarly named.

The right-wing government of Miklós Horthy cracked down on the party in 1928. Its leaders, such as Vági and Mátyás Rákosi were arrested and sentenced to one year in prison.

Bibliography

References

1925 establishments in Hungary
Banned communist parties
Communist parties in Hungary
Defunct political parties in Hungary
Political parties established in 1925
Political parties with year of disestablishment missing